Steven McNicoll is a Scottish actor, director, playwright and television presenter.

He co-wrote and starred in seven series of the BBC sketch show Velvet Soup on radio and later television, which earned him a BAFTA nomination.

He is also known to viewers for playing the young Rab C Nesbitt in the series of the same name which stars Gregor Fisher. He also appears regularly as Bra's Jeff in Donald McLeary and Sanjeev Kohli's Sony Award winning BBC Radio 4 sitcom Fags, Mags and Bags.

Mcnicoll has also presented 4 series of the educational programme Around Scotland for the BBC.
McNicoll has co written several plays for stage and radio.

In 2001, his play for BBC Radio 4, There Are Such Things, about the life and career of horror movie legend, Bela Lugosi, won the Hamilton Deane Award for best dramatic presentation from the Dracula Society. Prior to that, in 1997, as writer and actor, McNicoll was a recipient of The Herald Angel Award for his stage play Empty Jesters.

In 2005, Scottish cultural magazine The List nominated him at number 69 in their Hot 100 List which celebrated those who had made the biggest cultural impact in Scotland that year. In 2007, he starred as Sammy Fox in the critically acclaimed BBC TV comedy series Legit, which was nominated for a Rose D'or.

On stage, McNicoll has appeared in a huge variety of roles.

In 2003 he received the Leon Sinden Award for best supporting actor in Tony Roper's classic comedy/drama The Steamie. In 2005, he received plaudits for his portrayal of Oliver Hardy opposite Barnaby Power in the Tom McGrath play Laurel and Hardy, which was first performed at the Royal Lyceum Theatre Edinburgh and later transferred to the Olympia Theatre Dublin. The same year he was nominated for best supporting actor at the Theatrical Management Association awards for his portrayal of Cliff, opposite David Tennant as Jimmy Porter in Look Back in Anger which premiered at the Royal Lyceum Theatre and then transferred to the Theatre Royal, Bath.

In 2009, McNicoll starred along with Gordon Kennedy Colin McCredie and Sara Crowe in Tim Firth's comedy musical The Corstorphine Road Nativity at The Festival Theatre.

In November 2010, McNicoll's play The House was premiered at Oran Mor in Glasgow.

In 2011, he played Toby Belch in Twelfth Night and in 2012, David O Selznick in Moonlight and Magnolias in two hugely successful productions directed by Rachel O'Riordan in her debut season at Perth Theatre. Later that same year he was a recipient of The Argos Angel award for his performances in Paddy Cunneen's Fleeto and Wee Andy at the Brighton Festival.

McNicoll has also appeared regularly at the Kings Theatre, Glasgow in the annual Christmas pantomime.

On radio, he has worked extensively for the BBC for over thirty years, starting as a child actor, then progressing to writing and acting in plays and series for Radio 3 and 4. In July 2012, he could be heard as Pa Joad opposite Michelle Fairley in a three part Radio 4 Classic Serial adaptation of John Steinbeck's The Grapes of Wrath. And with Brian Cox in episodes of McLevy.

In 2017, he played Biesenthal in Marathon Man with Ian McDiarmid for Radio 4.

In April 2013 he co-starred With Johnny Watson and Gail Watson in Rob Drummond's play Quiz Show that launched The Traverse Theatre's Fiftieth Anniversary Season.

McNicoll is familiar to younger audiences as the teacher Mr Mackie in the much loved BBC TV version of Katie Morag. And his numerous appearances in the hugely popular Teacup Travels. Most recently he has starred as Bob in the BAFTA nominated CBeebies series Molly and Mack. The show ran for four successful series and a fifth series has just been commissioned to start filming in 2022.

He has recently appeared as an interviewer as part of Ian Lavender's Dad's Army reminiscence show "Don't tell him Pike!" which played to full houses at the Edinburgh Festival Fringe at the Assembly Rooms.

In 2016' he starred with Freddie Fox in the comedy horror short The Northleach Horror directed by David Cairns.

He starred as Jean at the Royal Lyceum in Murat Daltaban's DOT theatre company's acclaimed production of Zinnie Harris' adaptation of Ionesco's Rhinoceros as part of the Edinburgh International Festival in 2017.

Selected stage appearances

Selected film and TV

Selected radio appearances

References

External links

Steven McNicoll on BFI
Steven McNicoll on Radio Listings

Living people
Scottish dramatists and playwrights
Scottish male comedians
Scottish male film actors
Scottish male stage actors
Scottish male radio actors
Scottish male television actors
Year of birth missing (living people)